Candy Claws was an American dream pop group formed in Fort Collins, Colorado. It was formed in 2007 by Hank Bertholf and Ryan Hover, who shared interests in "electronics, droning shoegaze rock, and classic psychedelic pop.", as well as lyrics informed by their love of natural history.

History
In 2009, the band released their debut album,  In the Dream of the Sea Life, which was inspired by Rachel Carson's book The Sea Around Us. Originally released by Wave Magic label, it was re-released by Irish independent label Indiecater Records and earned enthusiastic reviews from the international music press. In 2010, the Twosyllable Records released the band's follow-up album, Hidden Lands, which was inspired by Richard M. Ketchum's The Secret Life of the Forest. During this time, Candy Claws also assembled an expanded eight-piece touring band for live performances. The band's third album, Ceres & Calypso in the Deep Time, was released in 2013.

In 2014, Ryan and Karen formed a new band, Sound of Ceres, featuring the members of The Apples in Stereo and The Drums. The band released their debut album, Nostalgia for Infinity in 2016.

Band members
 Ryan Hover — synthesizer, vocals
 Hank Bertholf — guitar, vocals
 Karen Hover (McCormick) — vocals, percussion, keyboard

Discography
Studio albums
 In the Dream of the Sea Life (2009)
 Hidden Lands (2010)
 Ceres & Calypso in the Deep Time (2013)

EPs and singles
 Daytrotter Session (2010)
 Verana Summers (2011)

Compilation albums
 Glacier Prey (2009)
 Warm Forever (2010)

Other releases
 Two Airships / Exploder Falls (2008) (an alternate soundtrack to Werner Herzog's film The White Diamond)
 Dreamland Soundtrack - Season 1 (2011)
 Do You Ever Feel That Way (2012) (a Starflyer 59 cover, with Mike Adams At His Honest Weight)

References

External links
 

Dream pop musical groups
American shoegaze musical groups
Noise pop musical groups
Indie pop groups from Colorado
2007 establishments in Colorado
Musical groups established in 2007
Culture of Fort Collins, Colorado